William Frederick Fisher (born April 1, 1946) is an American physician and a former NASA astronaut. Fisher went into space in 1985 on board the Space Shuttle. He retired from NASA in 1992  and returned to the full-time practice of medicine. His time at NASA coincided with that of his former wife and fellow astronaut Anna Lee Fisher. He is also the great grandson of Pony Express rider William Frederick Fisher (1839 - 1919)

Early life
Fisher was born April 1, 1946, in Dallas, Texas.

Education
 1964: Graduated from North Syracuse Central High School, North Syracuse, New York
 1968: Received a Bachelor of Arts degree in Biological Sciences from Stanford University
 1969–1971: Performed graduate work in Microbiology at the University of Florida
 1975: Received a Doctor of Medicine from the University of Florida
 1975–1977: Residency in General Surgery from UCLA Medical Center
 1978–1980: Performed graduate work in Engineering at the University of Houston

Career
Fisher graduated from Stanford University in 1968, and later served as a mountaineering instructor in  Leysin, Switzerland. He attended medical school at the University of Florida, graduating in 1975. After medical school, Fisher completed a surgical residency from 1975 to 1977 at Harbor–UCLA Medical Center in Torrance, California. He entered private practice in emergency medicine in 1977. He also attended graduate school at the University of Houston from 1978 to 1980. He was accepted as a NASA astronaut in 1980.

He has logged over 2,000 hours in prop, rotary-wing, jet aircraft and spacecraft.

NASA career
Fisher was selected as NASA Astronaut in 1980. His technical assignments included: scientific equipment operator for high altitude research on the WB-57F aircraft (1980–1981); astronaut medical support for the first four Shuttle missions (1980–1982); astronaut office representative for Extravehicular Mobility Unit (spacesuit) and Extravehicular Activity (EVA) procedures and development, including thermal vacuum testing of the suit (1981–1984); astronaut office representative for the Payload Assist Module (PAM-D) procedures and development (1982–1983); Astronaut office representative for Shuttle Mission Simulator (SMS) development (1983); support crewman for STS-8; CAPCOM for STS-8 and STS-9; Remote Manipulator System (RMS) hardware and software development team (1983); Manned Maneuvering Unit (MMU) development team (1983); Deputy Director of NASA Government-furnished and Contractor-furnished Equipment (1982–1983); Chief of Astronaut Public Appearances (1985–1987); Member of the U.S. Air Force Scientific Advisory Board (1986–1991); NASA Medicine Policy Board (1987–1991); Astronaut Office Space Station Manned Systems Division, and Health Maintenance Facility (1987–1989); Astronaut Office representative on space crew selection and retention standards for Space Station (1989–1991).
Fisher also continued to practice Emergency Medicine in the greater Houston area in conjunction with his astronaut duties.

Fisher was a mission specialist on STS-51-I, which launched from Kennedy Space Center, Florida, on August 27, 1985. STS-51-I was acknowledged as the most successful Space Shuttle mission yet flown. The crew aboard Space Shuttle Discovery deployed three communications satellites, the Navy SYNCOM IV-4, the Australian AUSSAT, and American Satellite Company's ASC-1. They also performed a successful on-orbit rendezvous with the ailing 15,400 pound SYNCOM IV-3 satellite, and two EVAs (spacewalks) by Fisher and van Hoften to repair it, including the longest spacewalk in history (at that time). Discovery completed 112 orbits of the Earth before landing at Edwards Air Force Base, California, on September 3, 1985. Fisher logged over 170 hours in space, including 11 hours and 52 minutes of Extravehicular Activity (EVA).

In 1990, Fisher led a study of the design of the planned space station. The New York Times reported that study "found the 500-foot structure was so complex and fragile that it could need up to 3,700 hours of maintenance a year by space-suited astronauts, as against the designers' original goal of 130 hours." In March of that year Fisher gained political notice "when he publicly accused his superiors at the space agency of ignoring the maintenance problem. Subsequently, he was called to Capitol Hill to testify before a number of committees."

Post-NASA

After leaving NASA, Fisher returned to the practice of emergency medicine.  He remains in active medical practice in the greater Houston area at the present time.

Personal life
He married fellow physician and later fellow astronaut, Anna Lee Fisher of St. Albans, New York on August 23, 1977. They have two daughters, Kristin Anne (b. July 29, 1983), who is a broadcast journalist, and Kara Lynne (b. January 10, 1989) who received her MBA degree in May 2017 from SMU in Dallas, Texas. The Fishers were divorced in 2000.

Fisher collects Bill Graham Fillmore, Family Dog, and other rock/concert music posters from the 1965-1973 time frame. He is an amateur luthier, specializing in making, repairing, and refinishing Neapolitan-style mandolins. Fisher is also the owner of Twenty-First Century Arms, a sporting goods company, and is both a Federal Firearms Licensee and NFA Firearms Dealer.

Organizations
 Diplomate of the American Board of Emergency Medicine
 Fellow of the American College of Emergency Physicians
 Fellow of the American Academy of Emergency Medicine
 Fellow of the American Society of Addiction Medicine
 Fellow of the World Association of Astronauts and Cosmonauts
 Member, Association of Space Explorers (ASE)
 Member, Wilderness Medical Society
 Associate Air Traffic Control Specialist
 Honorary Member, The St. Andrew Society of Tokyo and Yokohama
 Board Member, Stanford on the Moon Project
 Member, The Rock Poster Society (TRPS)

Awards and honors
 American Astronautical Society Victor A. Prather Award for Outstanding Achievement in the field of Extravehicular Activity (1985)
 Federation Aeronautique Internationale V.M. Komarov Diploma for Outstanding Achievement in the Field of Exploration of Outer Space(Awarded to the STS-51 Crew) (1985)
 NASA Space Flight Medal (1985)
 NASA Exceptional Service Medal (1988)
 Group Achievement Awards for EMU (Extravehicular Mobility Unit or "Space Suit") and MMU (Manned Maneuvering Unit) Development (1983, 1984)
 Group Achievement Awards for Payload Assist Module (PAM) Software Development and Vehicle Integration (1983)
 Named an ad hoc member of the U.S. Air Force Scientific Advisory Board (1986–1991)
 Appointed a member of the NASA Medicine Policy Board (1987–1991)

References

External links
 
 Spacefacts biography of William Frederick Fisher
 In 2002 Fisher posted a message to Beatles' producer George Martin's website -- now offline -- asking about the UV reflection of his original Sgt. Pepper LP -- a phenomenon little known by collectors at the time.
 In 2011 Tracy A. Woodward photographed Bill and Kristin Fisher for The Washington Post
 Is there a Hidden Message in the Sgt. Peppers LP that Glows in UV Light?

1946 births
Living people
Physician astronauts
People from Dallas
University of Florida College of Medicine alumni
University of Houston alumni
NASA civilian astronauts
Space Shuttle program astronauts
Stanford University alumni
Spacewalkers